John Statham (fl. 1388) was an English politician.

He was a Member (MP) of the Parliament of England for Totnes in September 1388.

References

Year of birth missing
Year of death missing
English MPs September 1388
Members of the Parliament of England (pre-1707) for Totnes